The Miladian dynasty was a local Persian Sunni Muslim dynasty that ruled Laristan during Medieval Ages. It traced its origins to Gorgin Milad, a descendant of the cycle of the legendary Kayanid Kay Khosrow. 

The dynasty was eventually invaded and conquered by Safavid invasions led by Allahverdi Khan in 1600 and 1601.

Iranian Muslim dynasties